Craig Edward Lewis (born 30 December 1976) is an Australian baseball player.

In 2004, he was part of the Australian Olympic baseball team, who achieved a Silver Medal in the baseball tournament at the Athens Olympics.

References

External links
Olympic info

1976 births
Living people
Australian baseball players
Baseball players at the 2004 Summer Olympics
Olympic baseball players of Australia
Olympic silver medalists for Australia
Olympic medalists in baseball
Medalists at the 2004 Summer Olympics